Subhash Chandra Bose Alluri is an Indian politician and a Member of Parliament to the 6th and 7th Lok Sabha from Narsapuram (Lok Sabha constituency), Andhra Pradesh.

References

India MPs 1977–1979
India MPs 1980–1984
People from Andhra Pradesh
Telugu politicians
1940 births
Living people
Indian National Congress politicians from Andhra Pradesh